Makner is a village in Malkapur tehsil of Buldhana district in Maharashtra, India. This is regarded as a holy place, with three major temples dedicated to Hindu saints. Nearby towns are Malkapur on west, Nandura on East.

Description
The town post office Postal Index Number ( PIN code) is 443102. It is located 37 km towards North from District headquarters Buldhana. 9 km from Malkapur. 477 km from State capital Mumbai.

Transport
There is a daily state bus service to and from Malkapur.

The nearest railway station is Malkapur railway station, on the Howrah–Nagpur–Mumbai line.

Politics
Sarpanch (Makner) : Aashabai Tejrao Wanare
Member Loksabha (Raver Region) : Raksha Khadse, (Bhartiya Janta Party)
Member Vidhansabha (Malkapur and Nandura Region): Shri Rajesh Ekade, (Indian National Congress)

Schools
Zp Mar Pri School, Makner
Aadarsha Vidyalaya, Umali
M.S.M English School, Malkapur
Navneet English School, Malkapur

References

Villages in Buldhana district